The 2022 Junior Pan Pacific Swimming Championships were held from 24 to 27 August 2022 at Veterans Memorial Aquatic Center in Honolulu, Hawaii, United States. Competition was conducted in a long course (50 m) pool. Swimmers between the ages of 13 and 18 competed. Each country was allowed to enter more than two swimmers per event, however only the two fastest swimmers per country in the preliminary heats of each event were eligible for medals. Events were contested in a heats and finals format.

A Parade of Nations for all competing countries, Australia, Canada, Cook Islands, Federated States of Micronesia, Fiji, Japan, New Zealand, Samoa, Singapore, and the United States, started off the evening session on day one of competition preceding the first final of the evening and included one flag bearer from each country circling the pool deck with the flag of their respective country before a welcome message and a traditional Hawaiian blessing of the pool.

For the first time at a single Junior Pan Pacific Swimming Championships, Australia won the gold medals in all men's individual freestyle events.

Results

Men

Women

Mixed

Medal table

Championships records pre-competition
The following Junior Pan Pacific Swimming Championships records were the established Championships records prior to the start of competition.

Men

Women

Mixed

Championships records set
The following Championships records were set during the course of competition.

Community impacts
Leading up to and during the competition, venue facilities were not accessible to local residents for regular usage.

References

External links
 Results

Swimming competitions in the United States
2022 in swimming
Junior Pan Pacific Swimming
2022 in sports in Hawaii